Azé is a former commune in the Mayenne department in northwestern France. On 1 January 2019, it was merged into the new commune Château-Gontier-sur-Mayenne.

Population

See also
Communes of Mayenne

References

Former communes of Mayenne